Cumaribo is a town and municipality located in the Department of Vichada, Republic of Colombia. Cumaribo was founded by Jose Nicolino Mattar in 1959.

In 2005 the municipality had an estimated total population of 28,718 inhabitants, 4,312 of these living in the head of the municipality or urban area. The municipality has 74,000 kmª, one of the largest municipalities in Colombia.

Geography

The municipality of Cumaribo borders to the north with the other three municipalities of the Department of Vichada; La Primavera, Puerto Carreño and Santa Rosalia; to the east with the Bolivarian Republic of Venezuela; to the south with the Department of Guainía; and to the west with the departments of Meta and Guaviare.

Cumaribo is within the Orinoquia Region of Colombia part of the Llanos plains that cover part of Colombia and the Bolivarian Republic of Venezuela. Three-quarters of the total area of the municipality of Cumaribo is savanna and the rest is covered by jungle with some small mounts including the Mount Vichada, Mount Mona, Mount Matavenia and Mount Guaripa.

There are three important rivers basins within the range of the municipality; the Orinoco River, the Meta River and the Guaviare River. The Meta river flows into the Orinoco river and the Guaviare river is the main current for the Muro, Uva and Mataven rivers. There are also two main lakes within the municipality; the Lake Caimán and the Lake Sesema.

Climate
Cumaribo has a tropical monsoon climate (Köppen Am) with heavy rainfall in all months except January and February. Temperatures are consistently very warm to hot – between  throughout the year – and humidity very high.

History

Cumaribo was officially founded by colonizers led by Jose Nicolino Mattar in 1959 but was inhabited previously by indigenous peoples such as the Guahibo.

Colombian armed conflict

The area has been under the influence of the Revolutionary Armed Forces of Colombia (FARC) guerrilla group due to the large production of coca leaves in the region and difficult access for the Military of Colombia.  Tomás Medina Caracas, a prominent FARC commander in charge of the illegal drug trade for this organization was killed on 1 September 2007 in a Colombian Army military operation in eastern Colombia within the municipality of Cumaribo near the border with Venezuela.

Demography

According to a census of 2001, the population at the head of the municipality was of 1055 inhabitants, 534 males, 521 females. Children between 0–14 years old was of 418 of which 206 were male and 212 female. Young adults between 15–24 years old is of 208 of which 95 were male and 113 female. Adults between the ages of 25 and 49 years old was of 358 of which 186 were male and 172 female. 49 and older were 71 people of which 47 were male and 24 female. More than half of the population were colonizers, 35% indigenous and a 15% mestizos.

Indigenous reserves in Cumaribo

The municipality of Cumaribo has some 38 indigenous reserves. The indigenous are predominantly the Guahibo people, Curripaco and Piapoco peoples pertaining to the Arawak language family, and the Cuiva, Desana, puinave and Saliva peoples.

 Santa Teresita del Tuparro*
 Tomo Bebery
 El Merey
 San Luis del Tomo
 La Esmeralda
 Valdivia
 Tsololoibo Matatu
 Muco Guarrojo
 Rawaneruba
 Saracure
 Únuma
 Concordia
 Barranco Lindo
 Corocora
 Palomas Carpintero
 Guaco
 Chocón
 Laguna Colorada
 Cali
 Minitas
 Morocoto-Buenavista-Manajuare
 Giro
 Yurí
 Cumaral
 Barranquito – Laguna Colorada
 Caño Bocón
 Laguna Anguilla – La Macarena
 Sejalito – San Benito
 Lagunas Negra y Cacao
 Berrocal – Ajota
 Matavén – Fruta
 Caño Zama
 Atana Pirariame
 Equa Guarracañá
 Bajo Vichada
 Aiwa Cuna Tsepajibo
 Caño Cavasi
 Guacamayas.

References

External links
 Cumaribo official website

Municipalities of Vichada Department
1959 establishments in Colombia